Paranyssicus is a genus of beetles in the family Cerambycidae, containing the following species:

 Paranyssicus conspicillatus (Erichson, 1847)
 Paranyssicus tresorensis Dalens, 2011

References

Elaphidiini